Sports in Colorado includes professional teams, college sports, and individual sports from the Denver Metropolitan Area and other cities.

Professional sports teams 

Colorado is the least populous state with a franchise in each of the major professional sports leagues. The state is able to support the teams because it contains a large metropolitan area with a higher population than any other city within . Therefore, many of the residents in the surrounding states support the teams in Denver, as shown by the reach of the Broncos' radio network.

The Colorado Springs Snow Sox professional baseball team is based in Colorado Springs. The team is a member of the Pecos League, an independent baseball league which is not affiliated with Major or Minor League Baseball.

Former professional sports teams

College athletics

Colorado is home to five NCAA Division I schools, plus a number of additional schools competing at lower levels. One school that competes at the lowest NCAA level, Division III, operates two Division I teams.

Other sports

The Unser family includes Al Unser, Al Unser Jr., Bobby Unser, Robby Unser and Louis Unser, and have won the Indianapolis 500 among other motorsports events.

The Pikes Peak International Hill Climb is a major motorsports event held at the Pikes Peak roads. Notable drivers include Mario Andretti, Michèle Mouton, Walter Röhrl, Ari Vatanen, Nobuhiro Tajima, Stig Blomqvist, Sébastien Loeb and Romain Dumas in addition to the Unsers.

Meanwhile, the Pikes Peak International Raceway has hosted motorsport events including IndyCar Series, NASCAR Busch Series, NASCAR Truck Series, AMA Superbike Championship and USAC Silver Crown Series.

The Cherry Hills Country Club has hosted professional golf tournaments such as the U.S. Open, U.S. Senior Open, U.S. Women's Open and PGA Championship.

See also
 Colorado Sports Hall of Fame
 Sports in Denver

References

External links